The Women's Flat Track Derby Association's (WFTDA) West Region was formed in 2006.  In 2009, teams from the eastern part of the region were moved into the North Central and South Central Regions.

From 2008, the WFTDA changed from having just two regional tournaments (East and West), to five, made up of teams from four regions: East, North Central, South Central and West.

For 2011, the region was reduced in size, with teams in New Mexico moving to the South Central Region.

WFTDA has now moved away from the Big 5 WFTDA Championships qualification tournament structure, last competed in 2012. Starting with the 2013 WFTDA season, the regions were discontinued in favour of an overall-rankings based system, and a new playoff format was created.

Member leagues

Former members

Rankings
Current Official WFTDA Regional Rankings as of January 29, 2013

Member teams unranked at this time:
 Cherry City Derby Girls
 Cheyenne Capidolls
 Derby Revolution of Bakersfield
 Lilac City Rollergirls
 Rainy City Roller Dolls
 Sick Town Derby Dames
 SoCal Derby

Region Champions

 2007 - Rat City Rollergirls
 2008 - Texas Rollergirls
 2009 - Oly Rollers
 2010 - Rocky Mountain Rollergirls
 2011 - Oly Rollers
 2012 - Oly Rollers

Hydra Trophy winners produced
 2009 - Oly Rollers
 2010 - Rocky Mountain Rollergirls

West Region titles won by league

See also
East Region
North Central Region
South Central Region

References

External links
 Western Regionals Tournament